Requienia is a genus of flowering plants in the legume family, Fabaceae. It belongs to the subfamily Faboideae. It is native to Botswana, Caprivi Strip, Namibia, Zambia and Cape Provinces, Free State and Northern Provinces (within South Africa).

The genus name of Requienia is in honour of Esprit Requien (1788–1851), who was a French naturalist, who made contributions in the fields of conchology, palaeontology and especially botany. 

The genus was circumscribed by Augustin Pyramus de Candolle in Mem. Fam. Legum. on page 224 in 1825.

Species
 Requienia pseudosphaerosperma 
 Requienia sphaerosperma

References

Millettieae
Fabaceae genera
Flora of Southern Africa